Calosoma alternans is a species of ground beetle in the family Carabidae. It is found in Central and South America.

Subspecies
These two subspecies belong to the species Calosoma alternans:
 Calosoma alternans alternans (Fabricius, 1792)  (Colombia, the Lesser Antilles, Mexico, and Venezuela)
 Calosoma alternans granulatum Perty, 1830  (Argentina, Brazil, and Uruguay)

References

Calosoma